Test of Arms is a board game published in 1988 by Game Designers' Workshop.

Contents
Test of Arms is a game in which worldwide post-World War II conflicts are covered.

Reception
Norman Smith reviewed Test of Arms for Games International magazine, and gave it 4 stars out of 5, and stated that "Despite its generalities the game gives a good representation of its subject and may have some appeal to the players of miniatures. It also plays well solitaire.."

References

Board games introduced in 1988
Game Designers' Workshop games